The 1986 Utah Utes football team represented the University of Utah in the Western Athletic Conference (WAC) during the 1986 NCAA Division I-A football season.  In their second season under head coach Jim Fassel, the Utes compiled am overall record of 2–9 record with a mark of 1–7 against conference opponents, finished in last out of nine teams in the WAC, and were outscored by their opponents, 444 to 278. The team played home games at Robert Rice Stadium in Salt Lake City, Utah.

Utah's statistical leaders included Larry Egger with 2,761 passing yards, Eddie Johnson with 1,046 rushing yards, and Loren Richey with 775 receiving yards.

Schedule

References

Utah
Utah Utes football seasons
Utah Utes football